Peruvian ceviche is a traditional dish widely eaten in Peru. The method of preparing it is different to that of ceviche in other places, using lime, fish, sweet potatoes and other foods.

In Peru, ceviche has been declared to be part of Peru's "national heritage" and has had a holiday declared in its honor. The classic Peruvian ceviche is composed of chunks of raw fish, marinated in freshly squeezed key lime or bitter orange (naranja agria) juice, with sliced onions, chili peppers, salt and pepper. Corvina or cebo (sea bass) was the fish traditionally used. The mixture was traditionally marinated for several hours and served at room temperature, with chunks of corn-on-the-cob, and slices of cooked sweet potato. Regional or contemporary variations include garlic, fish bone broth, minced Peruvian ají limo, or the Andean chili rocoto, toasted corn or cancha (corn nut) and yuyo (seaweed).  A specialty of Trujillo is ceviche prepared from shark (tollo or tojo). Lenguado (sole) is often used in Lima. The modern version of Peruvian ceviche, which is similar to the method used in making Japanese sashimi, consists of fish marinated for a few minutes and served promptly. It was developed in the 1970s by Peruvian-Japanese chefs including Dario Matsufuji and Humberto Sato.  Many Peruvian cevicherías serve a small glass of the marinade (as an appetizer) along with the fish, which is called leche de tigre or leche de pantera.

History

Very little is known about the origin of ceviche, but there are some references attributing the Peruvian ceviche to a mix of inputs, including European cuisine and Andean cuisine. In Peru its methods of preparation vary, and there is no single way to prepare a good ceviche.

References

Peruvian cuisine
Fish dishes